The Central District of Rigan County is a district (bakhsh) in Rigan County, Kerman Province, Iran.  The district has one city: Mohammadabad. The district has two rural districts (dehestan): Gavkan Rural District and Rigan Rural District.

References 

Rigan County
Districts of Kerman Province